The Benton County School District is a public school district based in Ashland, Mississippi (USA). The district's boundaries parallel that of Benton County.

History
Ashland Academy was established in Ashland in 1882. Reverend Enoch Wines was the school's first principal. W. P. Gunn also served as principal of the school.

F. S. Abney was Ashland High School's principal in 1915. After the school was integrated, many white students left the school.

As of 1965 the school calendar began in the mid-summer but then, in order to allow pupils to assist in the agricultural economy, dismissed for a month or longer in a "split session".

Segregated schools in the county were more equalized than in other places.

Schools
 Ashland Middle/High School (Grades 6-12)
 Ashland Elementary School (Grades K-5)
 Hickory Flat Attendance Center (Grades K-12)

In 1964 (prior to the end of racial segregation) the district had a school for whites in Ashland, a school for whites in Hickory Flat, and a school for blacks in Old Salem. Unlike other areas, the Old Salem school, renovated in 1959, was at the time the school with the highest level of modernization, and there was less inequality between the white and black schools compared to other areas.

Demographics

2006-07 school year
There were a total of 1,340 students enrolled in the Benton County School District during the 2006–2007 school year. The gender makeup of the district was 50% female and 50% male. The racial makeup of the district was 52.01% African American, 46.34% White, 1.19% Hispanic, and 0.45% Asian. 87.2% of the district's students were eligible to receive free lunch.

Previous school years

Accountability statistics

See also
List of school districts in Mississippi

References

External links

Education in Benton County, Mississippi
School districts in Mississippi